Big Brother 21 is the twenty-first season of various versions of television show Big Brother and may refer to:

 Big Brother 21 (U.S.), the 2019 edition of the U.S. version
 Big Brother Brasil 21, the 2021 edition of the Brazilian version